Southwark was originally the Southwark District, a colonial-era municipality in Philadelphia County, Pennsylvania.  Today, it is a neighborhood in the South Philadelphia section of Philadelphia, Pennsylvania. Because of its location south of the early Philadelphia, the name was adopted in allusion to the borough of Southwark in the county of London, England, just south of the city of London.

History

Southwark is one of the oldest English settlements in the County of Philadelphia.  It is actually the oldest district founded by settlers in Philadelphia, as a result of its inclusion in the former Swedish colony of New Sweden. Southwark was originally a tract of ground on the fast land of the Neck, lying between Passyunk and Wicaco. Due to the populations of the Swedish settlements of Wicaco and Moyamensing, Southwark grew earlier than other parts of the county apart from the city of Philadelphia.

The General Assembly created the district of Southwark on May 14, 1762, to facilitate cooperation with regard to street-building.  As early as 1838, the district had its own police force. Southwark was the location of the shipbuilding complex of Joshua Humphreys, the shipbuilder and naval architect who built the first six ships of the United States Navy and is known as the "Father of the U.S. Navy".

In 1854, when it was incorporated into the city of Philadelphia by the Act of Consolidation, the borough comprised the area bounded on the north by South Street, on the west by Passyunk Avenue from 5th and South to 10th and Reed; the boundary then ran along Reed Street, down 7th, and along Mifflin Street to the river.

Only a few traces of the name "Southwark" remain in this part of Philadelphia. The Southwark Post Office is located at 925 Dickinson Street. Other namesakes include Southwark Restaurant at 4th and Bainbridge Sts. and Southwark Development Corp., a public-housing project along Washington Avenue from 3rd to 5th Sts. Although not part of the Southwark District, the word "Southwark" is painted on a wall at 23rd Street and Washington Avenue.

In 1969, this area of Philadelphia was renamed, and the Northern portion is now commonly known as Queen Village. The neighborhood of Pennsport is the primary southern half of what was Southwark.  The area is a diverse community, a multi-racial neighborhood of middle class, working class, and professionals.  

The historic district, as defined by the National Register of Historic Places, is bounded by 5th Street on the west, Lombard Street on the north, Washington Avenue on the south, and Front, Catharine, and Queen Streets and Columbus Boulevard (formerly Delaware Avenue) on the east.

Education
Residents are within the School District of Philadelphia.

Residents are zoned to Southwark School (K-8) and South Philadelphia High School.

The Vare-Washington School, which occupies the former George Washington School, is in proximity to Southwark. Persons zoned to Vare-Washington are also zoned to Furness High School. and residents of the former Abigail Vare School zone, are also zoned to Furness High School.

See also

 Queen Village, Philadelphia
 Fabric Row (Philadelphia)

References

External links

Chronology of the Political Subdivisions of the County of Philadelphia, 1683-1854
Information courtesy of ushistory.org
Incorporated District, Boroughs, and Townships in the County of Philadelphia, 1854 By Rudolph J. Walther - excerpted from the book at the ushistory.org website

Related reading
Johnson, Amandus (1927) The Swedes on the Delaware (International Printing Company, Philadelphia)
Weslager, C. A. (1988) New Sweden on the Delaware 1638-1655 (The Middle Atlantic Press, Wilmington ) 

Neighborhoods in Philadelphia
Municipalities in Philadelphia County prior to the Act of Consolidation, 1854
Populated places established in 1762
1854 disestablishments in Pennsylvania
National Register of Historic Places in Philadelphia
Historic districts in Philadelphia
Irish-American history
Irish-American culture in Pennsylvania
Irish-American culture in Philadelphia
South Philadelphia
Historic districts on the National Register of Historic Places in Pennsylvania